Daniel Krčmář (born 8 January 1971) is a Slovak biathlete. He competed in the men's sprint event at the 1994 Winter Olympics.

References

1971 births
Living people
Slovak male biathletes
Olympic biathletes of Slovakia
Biathletes at the 1994 Winter Olympics
People from Ústí nad Orlicí